Microlepia strigosa, known as hay-scented fern, lace fern, rigid lace fern and palapalai, is a fern indigenous to the Hawaiian islands and is also native to other parts of the tropics and subtropics including India and Malaysia. This fern belongs to a group of about seventy Microlepia species in the bracken or hay-scented fern family (Dennstaedtiaceae). There are two indigenous species and a hybrid found in the main Hawaiian Islands. It is also known by the botanical names: Davallia hirta, Davallia setosa, Davallia strigosa, Dicksonia kaulfussiana, Dicksonia strigosa, Microlepia hirta, Microlepia setosa, Stenoloma tenuifolium, Trichomanes strigosum.

Uses
Early Hawaiians used the fronds to decorate hula altars dedicated to Laka, goddess of hula. The ferns were used as head lei (lei poʻo), neck lei (lei ʻāʻī), and wrist lei (lei kūpeʻe) and to provide a soft base against the skin. The plants were believed to be a cure for insanity. It was also used to bathe in and young leaf fronds were fed to babies.

References

External links
 GRIN-Global Web v 1.9.7.1: Taxonomy + distribution of Microlepia strigosa
 Plants for Hawaiian lei: Palapalai (accessed September 25, 2015)
 Hui ku Maoli Ola: Palapalai (accessed September 25, 2015)
 Bishop Museum Hawaiian Ethnobotany Online Database (accessed September 25, 2015)

Dennstaedtiaceae
Ferns of Asia
Ferns of Oceania
Native ferns of Hawaii
Ferns of India
Flora of China
Flora of Japan
Flora of Nepal
Flora of Sri Lanka
Flora of Thailand
Flora of Vietnam
Flora of Guangxi
Flora of Yunnan
Plants described in 1849
Taxa named by Carl Borivoj Presl
Native Hawaiian culture